Mark Harris (born 29 March 1985) is an Australian IT administrator, athlete and coach who played softball for the Australian Steelers fastpitch softball team.

Harris was first selected by the Steelers in 2010 to play in a Tri-Series against New Zealand and Argentina at Hawker Park, ACT. Harris  played in the 2013 and 2015 World Series Fastpitch Team with the Steelers

Personal 
Harris was born on 29 March 1985 in Derby, Western Australia.   Soon after his birth, the Harris family moved to Perth.

Harris attended Sevenoaks Senior College.  In 2003, he started attending Edith Cowan University, where he studied Sports Science. After university,  In 2009, Harris moved to Melbourne. He is currently working as an IT Projects Administrator for the West Coast Eagles Football Club in Perth

In 2015 Harris announced his engagement to Leah Brenton in Paris.

Softball 

Harris has played catcher, outfielder and occasionally pitcher.  Harris originally started in softball as an umpire and then coach, with over 350 games experience.  He started playing the sport at the age of 17. In 2003 and 2009, he suffered shoulder injuries that took him out of play, but he recovered from them.

Steelers appearances 
2010 - Tri-Series, ACT Canberra - New Zealand, Argentina
2011 - Friendship Series, Argentina
2012 - 2013 World Series Qualifiers, ACT Canberra - Samoa, PNG
2013 - World Series, Auckland New Zealand / Trans-Tasman Series, Auckland New Zealand - New Zealand vs Australia
2014 - 2015 World Series Qualifiers, Auckland New Zealand - Samoa, New Zealand
2015 - World Series, Saskatoon Canada

Western Blaze appearances
2005 - Tasmania
2006 - Sydney
2007 - Sydney
2008 - 
2009 - 
2011 - Brisbane
2012 - Sydney
2013 - Canberra
2014 - Perth
2015 - Brisbane

While with the Blaze, Harris won MVP Trophies in 2013 and 2011. He makes appearances behind the dish and also plays Leftfield. In 2014 he made his debut on the pitching rubber which was short lived however, he's since pitched again in 2015 with better results.

Coaching 
2004 - SEMSA Association Junior Head Coach, Perth
2005 - State Under 19's Assistant Coach, Tasmania
2006 - State Under 19's Assistant Coach, Canberra
2010 - State Under 16's Head Coach, in Sydney
2015 - State Under 17's Head Coach, in Canberra
2016 - Appointed as the Under 17's Head Coach, in Perth

Harris had previously attained his coaching certifications and has since re-certified as a level 2 coach. Harris has helped develop Softball clinics in Western Australia.

Club & Association level 

Harris started his career at Dale Districts Men's Softball Association in which he's won 4 Runner-Up MVP's along with one MVP Trophy. He also played with the Bandits, Rebels, Breakaways, Animals, Bayswater and Western Cobras. Most of his  club level softball has been with Bayswater Morley Softball Club.

In 2014 Harris was the winner of the Newcrest Softball WA Spirit Award. Over a period of eight years Harris has join Toowoomba Softball Association at the Brisbane State Championships 7 times.

References

1985 births
Australian softball players
Living people